Ezzell Independent School District is a small public school district located in southern Lavaca County, Texas (USA). It is by Hallettsville. The school mascot is the "Mustangs". The school has 64 students enrolled as of the 2010–2011 school year.

In 2008 and 2009, the school district was rated "exemplary" by the Texas Education Agency.

Grades
The school serves grades PK through 8.

Annual events
Each October the school hosts its annual "Fall Festival", which includes an auction, raffle, food stand, and game booths.

The school also holds a Christmas play every year.

References

External links

School districts in Lavaca County, Texas